Osage is a Unicode block containing characters from the Osage alphabet, which was devised in 2006 for writing the Osage language spoken by the Osage people of Oklahoma, United States.

History
The following Unicode-related documents record the purpose and process of defining specific characters in the Osage block:

References 

Unicode blocks